Legoland Windsor Resort, styled and also known as Legoland Windsor, is a theme park and resort in Windsor, Berkshire in England, themed around the Lego brand. The park opened on 17 March 1996 and is currently operated by Merlin Entertainments. The park's attractions consist of a mixture of Lego-themed rides, models, and building workshops targeted at children between three and twelve.

In 2019, the park had 2.43 million visitors, making it the most visited theme park in the United Kingdom. However, in 2020 the park had a very limited operating season due to the coronavirus pandemic and limited capacity. As a result of this Legoland Windsor had a huge drop in attendance and was the 4th most visited park in the U.K. in 2020. Overall, attendance has steadily risen since 2005. Legoland Windsor regularly draws more attendees than the original Legoland Billund Resort in Denmark; in 2011, it became the tenth-most popular theme park in Europe, a position it has held every year since. Legoland Windsor typically opens from March to January, with closures on some days.

History
In 1987, The Lego Group began research for the development of a second Legoland park after Legoland Billund with over 1000 sites considered. In January 1992, Windsor Safari Park went into receivership and the  site was chosen for the second development. Between 1992 and 1994, planning, design, site preparation and the design and construction of models began. New accommodations were created for the safari animals and services, foundations and infrastructures were installed at the park. In 1995, a scale replica of Big Ben was installed in Miniland whilst other buildings and attractions were becoming established. In September, advance bookings were opened for entrance tickets. Final installations were completed by the beginning of 1996 and at this point, the Legoland Windsor staff-base was recruited. Legoland Windsor opened on 17 March 1996. During its first season, the park attracted over 1.4 million guests.

In April 2005, The Lego Group decided to sell Legoland parks following losses across the company.  On 13 July 2005, Legoland was acquired by the Blackstone Group and control of the parks passed to Merlin Entertainments.

During the 2020 season, the resort closed on 20 March 2020 due to the COVID-19 pandemic. It reopened on 4 July 2020 following a 'lockdown' in England. The resort remained open until 5 November when due to government guidance it was forced to close. It reopened for a shortened period over the Christmas period on 4 December 2020 however was again forced to close when the Royal Borough of Windsor and Maidenhead, where the resort is located, was placed in Tier 4 restrictions on 19 December 2020 under which theme parks could not open.

The resort announced in January 2021 that the resort would not hold its 'Brick Week' event in February due to the continuing lockdown in England. It then was announced in February 2021 the resort would open on 12 April 2021 when lockdown restrictions in England allowed theme parks to open. However, it announced its indoor rides and attractions would open later in the year due to government guidelines.

In May 2021, the resort opened a new land titled 'Lego Mythica: World of Mythical Creatures' which includes the United Kingdom's first Flying Theatre ride called 'Flight of the Sky Lion'. 'Mythica' will the first time a Legoland resort launches a Lego intellectual property not first released as a Lego set. Also included in the land is a drop tower ride called 'Fire and Ice Freefall' and the rebranded 'Hydra's Challenge' previously known as 'S.Q.U.I.D Surfer'. This land saw the Adventure Land name discontinued for this area of the resort.

In September 2022, the resort opened a new event titled 'Brick or Treat's Halloween Party' will be launched on 1 October 2022 until 31 October 2022. It also included a new 4D movie ‘The Great Monster Chase!’.

Areas

The park is split into 12 themed lands, incorporating various attractions, restaurants and shops: The Beginning, Duplo Valley, Knight's Kingdom, Lego City, Miniland, Lego Ninjago World, Pirate Shores, Heartlake City, Kingdom of the Pharaohs, Land of the Vikings, Bricktopia, Lego Mythica: World of Mythical Creatures.

The Beginning
The Beginning is the entrance area to the park. It is composed of a plaza area containing entrance turnstiles, ticket sales, guest services and toilets and stretches to contain a small part of the resort at the bottom of the funicular railway. It is notable for having a view of the area surrounding the resort including the nearby town of Windsor, Heathrow Airport & parts of London.

The main resort shop, The BIG Shop, can be found here which sells a number of Lego products as well as souvenirs. It is the largest Lego store in the UK. Also in the area is the Photo Shop which is where guests can collect photos taken on rides with cameras operated by Picsolve, a company contracted by a number of Merlin Entertainments resorts.

There are a number of food and beverage outlets here with the main site down cafe is the Hill Top Cafe. It is complemented by a smaller coffee outlet in the entrance plaza and the Sweet Stop which sells sweets and other treats.

The only ride located in The Beginning is the Hill Train, a funicular,  narrow gauge railway down a curved slope. The main purpose of the Hill Train is to transport guests from The Beginning to the lower parts of the resort leading to an area between Lego City and Lego Ninjago World, which is still considered to be part of The Beginning. It is the only ride or attraction to be retained from Windsor Safari Park, being refurbished when the park opened with stained glass windows made from translucent Lego bricks by local school children. It travels 300 metres between two stations, with a height difference between the top and bottom stations of approximately 27 metres.

Previously located in The Beginning was the Creation Centre which opened in 2000. This building has housed a number of attractions since it has opened. The first main attraction it contained was Lego Racers which opened with the Creation Centre. Here, guests could create their own virtual Lego racer through an innovative system and went through a process which culminated in them being able to race their character against other guests. The original Lego Racers attraction suffered from reliability issues and closed at the end of 2004. However, it was revived in 2009 by members of the original team and was able to reopen under the new name of Rocket Racers. However, reliability issues remained and it saw its final guests over the weekend of 8–9 October 2011. The attraction space was repurposed for Star Wars Miniland which was based on the Star Wars franchise depicting a number of scenes in Lego and opened in 2012. Unlike Lego Racers & Rocket Racers it was classed as a walkthrough attraction with no queue. Instead, guests walked round much like the main Miniland land. In 2016, a large model of the Death Star was installed as the centrepiece of the attraction. However, the attraction closed on 31 December 2019 echoing other Legoland Resorts which all closed their Star Wars Miniland if they had them, rumoured due to a licensing deal between Lucasfilm and Merlin Entertainments ending. Currently the space is empty and Legoland Windsor have announced no plans for its future.

The Creation Centre is also home to Legoland Windsor's model makers who display busts of famous figures as well as a view of their studio in a space on the second floor of the centre. On the ground floor of the centre is Apocalypseburg which is part of The Lego Movie 2 set used and shares space with a Movie Store.

Duplo Valley
Duplo Valley is a land aimed at smaller children based on the Duplo toy bricks, with the majority of rides being 'family rides'. Since the resort's opening the land has rotated through a number of different names including Explore Land, Duplo Gardens and Duplo Land.

At the beginning of the 2020 season, Duplo Valley was reopened following a refurbishment and the construction of a new ride, the Duplo Dino Coaster. The Duplo Dino Coaster, originally planned to be called the Duplo Dream Coaster became the resort's third rollercoaster (after The Dragon & Dragon's Apprentice). Aimed to be a 'My First Coaster' it saw a soft opening before the park's temporary closure due to the COVID-19 pandemic. It was designed by Mack Rides but manufactured by ART Engineering GmbH. Alongside the opening of the new ride was the re-theming of three rides and attractions: Duplo Express (previously Duplo Train), Duplo Airport (previously Duplo Valley Airport and before that, Chopper Squadron and Whirly Birds) and Duplo Playtown (previously Brickville but it has gone by this name before). Also located in Duplo Valley is Fairy Tale Brook, a boat ride which takes guests round a course which contains Lego models of fairy tale characters.

Duplo Valley is home to the resort's water park which consists of two separate rides and attractions: Drench Towers and Splash Safari. Drench Towers is a water splash area with multiple slides which was placed on land previously occupied by Mole-in-One Mini Golf. Splash Safari is a smaller splash area for toddlers which consists of water features made of Duplo models and is located below Drench Towers.Also in Duplo Valley is the Duplo Valley Theatre which is a puppet theatre which shows classic fairy tales. It is located adjacent to Fairy Tale Brook. One of the resort's family restaurants, Farmer's Joe Chicken Company, is found opposite the theatre.

Other rides in the land are Merlin's Challenge (previously known as Knight's Quest), a flat carousel ride and Dragon's Apprentice, a smaller rollercoaster acting as an alternative for younger guests unable to ride The Dragon.

In previous years, the land has assumed a role as Christmas Kingdom when open in the winter months and houses a grotto in the ride area of The Dragon.

Lego CityLego City, formerly known as Traffic, is themed around transport. 
Balloon School: a simulated hot air balloon ride. 
Coastguard HQ: a boat school ride for children
Fire Academy: 
L-Drivers: drive school for 3–5 children 
City Driving School: drive school here children can drive their own car. In 2019, a Vekoma 'mad-house' attraction called Haunted House Monster Party was added to the area and in 2020, Atlantis Submarine Voyage by Sealife, which features "submarine" vehicles used to travel through the tank, was rethemed to become Lego City Deep Sea Adventure.MinilandMiniland is a miniature park in Lego form, depicting towns and cities from around the world, using nearly 40 million Lego bricks, in models. The area features a number of animated models, interacting with each other. Motor vehicles use cables under the paths emitting radio wave signals to steer and allow charging when required and overnight. The train system runs on tracks, slowing for stations using slow down bars and also charging, and the boats use rubber loops under the water driven by motors, with sensors to detect the boats for operating bridges and locks. The system, with lights and sounds, is run by 14 computers using 300 kilometres of underground cabling.

The land is divided into different areas as they are depicted, these include: London, the Rest of England, Scotland, Wales and Europe (composed of the Netherlands, Belgium, Italy, Sweden, Denmark & France). In 2018, Miniland saw an expansion called 'Explore the World' which added more Lego models of global sites including the Sydney Opera House, Forbidden Palace & Saint Basil's Cathedral. Also added in 2018 was Miniland USA, another expansion with detailed Lego models and scenes depicting famous American sites.

 Lego Ninjago World 
Lego Ninjago World opened in May 2017 based upon the popular Ninjago TV Series and Lego brand. The centrepiece attraction is a 4D interactive ride, Ninjago: The Ride manufactured by Triotech. Also in the land is the relocated and rebranded ride 'Destiny's Bounty', a Rockin' Tug ride based on the ship in the TV series. The ride was previously known as 'Longboat Invader and opened in 2008.

Pirate ShoresPirate Shores features a log flume, Pirate Falls, a play area and a pirate ship ride named the Jolly Rocker. From 1996 to 2010, this area was known as Wild Woods.

Heartlake City
Heartlake City (formerly Lego City until redecoration in 2015), based on the Lego Friends product range, includes two rides: The Legoland Express, a railway ride around Kingdom of the Pharaohs, and a Disk'O coaster called Mia's Riding Adventure. Also in the area is the "Return to Skeleton Bay" pirate stunt show, and "Lego Friends to the Rescue", a live music concert around the harbour performed by the Lego Friends.

Kingdom of the Pharaohs

The Kingdom of the Pharaohs contains "Laser Raiders", an interactive dark ride through an Egyptian tomb where visitors shoot targets to gain points. Also in this area is Scarab Bouncers, Aero Nomad, Desert Chase and Thunder Blazer. The latter three rides are fairground based attractions such as a carousel and a Ferris wheel ride.

Land of the VikingsLand of the Vikings is situated behind the Hill Train; this was opened in 2007, and is based on the plunderings of Nordic Vikings. This land is home to two attractions, Vikings’ River Splash: An attraction manufactured by ABC Rides and features Lego models, water sprays and cannons along its course. The other attraction is Spinning Spider located at the bottom of the area, this ride is a spinning teacups style ride where guests ride in log-style gondolas as an animatronic Lego spider gnashes its jaws and breathes smoke on a web above.

BricktopiaBricktopia (Previously called Imagination and Imagination Centre) is an area themed around education through Lego. The centre piece being the Legoland Learning Academy (Previously Lego Education Centre) which is where a dedicated Education team offers National Curriculum workshops. The Education team has been recognised nationally by the School Travel Awards as the 'Best Venue for STEM Learning (Science, Technology, Engineering, Maths)' in 2019.

The only Ride in this land is Sky Rider, which is an elevated track ride opened in March 1996 and refurbished between the 2001 and 2002 seasons. The attraction of this ride is the views that can be seen of Miniland as it cruises over Imagination and also allows views of the surrounding area.

Other attractions in Bricktopia include, "Lego Studios 4D". Lego Studios 4D was previously known as the Imagination Theatre and now shows a number of Lego-themed films throughout the day. In the 2020 season, these were: Lego City 4D – Officer in Pursuit; Lego Ninjago – Master of the 4th Dimension and Lego Movie 4D A New Adventure.

In 2023 a new attraction will open within Bricktopia called "LEGO® Ferrari Build & Race" replacing the "LEGO Reef". 

Lego Mythica: World of Mythical Creatures
Mythica is a new land based on a new Lego IP. This will open in May 2021 where Adventure Land was previously located. The centrepiece ride will be Flight of the Sky Lion, a Flying theatre ride. Also in the land will be a drop tower ride and the rethemed 'S.Q.U.I.D. Surfer' ride to be known as 'Hydra's Challenge'.

 Resort hotels 
Legoland Windsor Resort currently has two hotels.

 Legoland Hotel 
The Legoland Hotel opened its doors in March 2012.  The hotel is located at the back of the park, in the Adventure land section, on the old site of the Jungle Coaster. Guests enter the hotel on the ground floor but enter the park on the 2nd floor. The hotel is home to the Bricks Restaurant (a buffet) and the Skyline Bar, both on the 2nd floor. The resort featured 6 different types of themed rooms, they were Pirate, Kingdom, Adventure, Premium Pirate, Premium Kingdom and Premium Adventure.  Over the year's these room themes have changed, the hotel no longer offers Premium Kingdom rooms but now offers Ninjago and Lego Friends rooms.  Guests staying at both Hotels get access to the pirate-themed indoor pool and fitness facility (located at the Legoland Hotel) as well as a treasure hunt in each room and access to select attraction before the general public in the park. The second floor is not only home to the restaurants previously mentioned, but a loft where Lego video games can be played on PlayStation 4 consoles. The ground floor features a Lego store and bins of bricks that can be built with. There is a castle themed baggage check area by the double doors.

 Castle Hotel 
The Legoland Castle Hotel opened its doors on 1 July 2017. The hotel was opened by competition winner James Waine who designed a model that was built by professional model makers and put outside the hotel. The hotel offers two different themes of rooms, Wizard and Knights. The hotel is only accessible from the park, guests must check-in at the Legoland Hotel and travel through the hotel and the park to reach the Castle Hotel. The Castle Hotel is located next to the Legoland Hotel. The hotel is home to the Tournament Tavern restaurant, which offers table service meals. Guests staying at both Hotels get access to the pirate-themed indoor pool and fitness facility (located at the Legoland Hotel) as well as a treasure hunt in each room and access to select attraction before the general public in the park.

 Holiday Village 
In Legoland Windsor's ten-year plan, the park have expressed interest in building a holiday village that would consist of 450 Lodges that would be built in two phases. These lodges would range from barrel-style glamping to large family lodges. The majority of phase one (120 out of 150) would consist of Lodges that could sleep up to a family of five. The new Holiday Village is planned to be located near the front of the park.

 Rides and Attractions 

 Operating rides 

Former rides and attractions

Reserve & Ride (formerly Q-Bot)
For the 2008 season, the Q-Bot queuing system (now called Reserve & Ride) was introduced. For a per-person fee, guests are provided with a small pager-like device to "reserve" places in queues virtually, allowing guests to use their queuing time elsewhere in the park. The initial contract between Q-Bot developers Lo-Q was for 1 year from 8 April 2008. This contract was extended for 2009 before a new 3-year contract was signed on 26 March 2010. Three tiers of the device are available at different prices which reduce the queue time by different proportions.

Incidents
 In 2006, a fire broke out in a storage barn onsite during the end of season fireworks on 28 October, with no injuries.
In October 2007, a fire broke out in a shed being used to store chemicals.
 In 2008, after noise complaints, Jungle Coaster plastic housing was placed over the cars, leading to reduced capacity to two adults per car, due to weight restrictions. However, at the end of the 2009 season, the ride was removed  and the site used for hotel construction.
 In September 2010, the park's large number of wasps during the season was discussed on Watchdog, with general manager Sue Kemp appearing with host Anne Robinson and confirming new signage, actions and details on the website.
 In February 2014, the park cancelled a private event organised by Islamic cleric Haitham al-Haddad due to safety reasons following a backlash and threats by nationalist groups.
 In August 2016, two six-year-old girls were sexually assaulted while at the resort, leading to a police investigation over the incident.
In 2019, a five-year-old boy was involved in an accessibility dispute at Ninjago: the Ride making national news. It was settled in late 2020.
 On 31 July 2022, a fire broke out on the entrance to the Legoland Hotel.

Awards
Since opening in 1996, the park has won a number of awards:

 Voted UK's Number One Family Attraction by Group Leisure Magazine'', 1999.

See also
Legoland Discovery Centre

References

External links

 Legoland Windsor
Legoland Windsor Park Map (Flash Animation)
 .
 
 .

Legoland
Buildings and structures in Windsor, Berkshire
Amusement parks in England
1996 establishments in England
Tourist attractions in Berkshire
Articles containing video clips
Amusement parks opened in 1996